Patrick Joseph Bermingham (15 March 1886 – January 1959) was an Irish police officer and sportsman, specialising in the discus. He was from Moyasta in County Clare and joined the Dublin Metropolitan Police.

Bermingham won ten Irish national discus titles: IAAA titles in 1919 and 1920, and NACAI titles in 1923–4–5–6–7, 1930, 1932, and 1933. He held the Irish record at  until 1939. He won five English AAA discus titles: 1924–5–6, 1932, and 1934. He also won four Irish titles in each of the 56 lbs weight throw events: for height (1923, 1925–6, 1929) and for distance (1923, 1925–6–7). He represented Ireland at the 1924 Summer Olympics, but was eliminated in the qualifying round of the discus competition; his longest throw would have qualified for the final six but was discounted as a foul. His best mark of  ranked him eleventh overall. He is recorded as having competed in the 1934 British Empire Games, though sources vary as to whether he represented the Irish Free State or Northern Ireland. He finished outside the top seven.

He is buried in Mount Jerome cemetery.

Several online football databases mistakenly suggest that Bermingham also played for the Irish Free State national football team vs Hungary in 1934, but that was a different  Patrick Joseph Bermingham.

References

External links
 https://www.findagrave.com/memorial/105840663/patrick-bermingham

1886 births
1959 deaths
Irish male discus throwers
Olympic athletes of Ireland
Athletes (track and field) at the 1924 Summer Olympics
Commonwealth Games competitors for Northern Ireland
Athletes (track and field) at the 1934 British Empire Games
Dublin Metropolitan Police officers
Sportspeople from County Clare